The Central Information Commission is a statutory body, set up under the Right to Information Act in 2005 under the Government of India to act upon complaints from those individuals who have not been able to submit information requests to a Central Public Information Officer or State Public Information Officer due to either the officer not have been appointed, or because the respective Central Assistant Public Information Officer or State Assistant Public Information Officer refused to receive the application for information under the Right to Information Act.

The commission includes one chief information commissioner and not more than ten information commissioners who are appointed by the President of India on the recommendation of a committee consisting of the Prime Minister as Chairperson, the Leader of Opposition in the Lok Sabha and a Union Cabinet Minister to be nominated by the Prime Minister. Two women have been chief information commissioners: Deepak Sandhu (fourth chief information commissioner overall) and Sushma Singh (fifth overall).

Chief Information Commissioners
The following have held the post of the chief Information Commissioners.

State Information Commission

Following is the list of State Information Commissions.

References

Right to Information in India
Government agencies of India
Organisations based in Delhi
Government agencies established in 2005
2005 establishments in Delhi